Exeposé is the official student-run newspaper of the University of Exeter. With an estimated print circulation of around 3,500. Exeposé is free and published fortnightly during term time. Its sections include news, features, lifestyle, science, satire, sport, screen, music, arts and literature, tech, and international.

Exeposé is compiled by a team of around 46 section editors, two photographers, headed by four editors, two print and two online, and four deputies. It was the winner of the NUS Student Publication of the Year 2008 and is used as a forum for reportage and debate of both national and student-related issues. As of the 2006–2007 academic year it became a full colour fortnightly paper available to all students at the Streatham and St. Luke's campuses. From 2010 onwards it has increased online presence through Twitter and Facebook as well as online viewing platforms such as Issuu.com. In September 2012 Exeposé launched its own website, after the now-defunct Xmedia Online site had stopped operating as a news service.

History
Exeposé released its first issue to the students of Exeter University in 1987, although the existence of a student newspaper in some form can be traced back to 1938 when the latest news was presented in a broadsheet format newspaper called The South Westerner. During the early to mid-1990s, Exeposé was produced on a typewriter in an eight-page A4 booklet format, with sections including news, reviews, sport and an agony aunt feature.

In the mid-1990s, Exeposé became a weekly tabloid newspaper, ranging in size from 8 to 12 pages, and printed by Express & Echo Publications (which has since gone through several name and structural changes, its publishing arm now known as Harmsworth Printing). During the late 90s, Exeposé began to increase in size to 16-20 pages on average, some of these pages in spot colour or full colour. Between 2,000 and 2,500 papers were printed for each issue, distributed to drop-off points on Streatham and St. Luke's Campuses.

In 1997, a new Exeposé logo was designed, based on the Carlsberg logo (as shown in the gallery below) and from 1997 to 2000 the paper proclaimed itself to be 'Probably the Best Student Newspaper in the World'. The logo is the longest running in the newspaper's history, its use spanning 8 years and over 150 issues. In 2006 this logo was replaced by a new masthead more similar to national newspaper mastheads.

In 2007 the paper hit national headlines after Boris Johnson made controversial comments on the subject of the death of an Exeter student in an interview with the paper. His criticism of the University's Athletic Union and its ban on initiation ceremonies was featured by the BBC, The Sun, The Guardian, Daily Express, Daily Mirror, The Times and Daily Mail. Johnson later made a statement regarding the intention of his comments on his website.

Exeposé's parent site X-Media Online launched a new web-portal for the newspaper in September 2007 as part of an overhaul of all student media sites at the University of Exeter and saw more content put online. Over time, the role of X-Media Online developed from a purely technical, hosting function to its own individual news source, effectively creating a new news source on campus and distinguishing itself from Exeposé. During the 2011–12 academic year, plans were made to reunify X-Media Online and Exeposé, rebranding the online news site to form the paper's new website.

In 2008, the R&R section was redesigned so as to be a part of the main newspaper, rather as a separate pull-out, in an effort to increase readership of the section. In June of the same year, writing from Exeposé was showcased in the inaugural issue of FS Magazine as an example of "the best of student journalism".

The paper underwent further re-designs from May to September 2010, updating its masthead once again, introducing new headline and body fonts and introducing coloured section banners, attempting greater design consistency. In March 2011, Exeposé sought greater outreach through Twitter, Facebook and issuu as part of a strategy to further increase the paper's readership.

In August 2012, Exeposé launched its own website, incorporating the previously separate X-Media Online. The website launched with an entirely new online editorial team. In October 2012, Exeposé celebrated its 25th Anniversary with an exhibition of past front pages on campus, a birthday party at Reed Hall and a special anniversary edition of the paper featuring interviews with past editors.

Under the editorship of Tom Payne and Zoe Bulaitis, the 2012/13 editorial year saw Exeposé get nominated for the 'Student Publication of the Year' prize at the Guardian Student Media Awards - the first time the paper had been nominated for such an award in over five years. During that year the paper experienced an increase in the paper's readership with the launch of the website and a number of new innovations - including a new logo and complete re-design of the paper. Exeposé Online won runner-up 'Student Website of the Year' at the Guardian Student Media Awards 2014, following the editorship of Olivia Luder, Liam Trim, Meg Lawrence and Callum Burroughs (2013-2014, 2014–2015).

The editors also spearheaded investigative and campaigning front-page stories, starting in May 2012, many of which received local and national media attention and proved popular with readers. In January 2013 Exeposé made national headlines after it controversially reported that staff members working for The Students' Guild filmed and distributed footage of students engaging in sexual activity during the University's notorious Safer Sex Ball. The paper then landed one of the biggest scoops in its history, finding and breaking the news that the 21-year-old ball had been cancelled by the Students' Guild. The news was picked up by BBC, the Independent, The Daily Telegraph, the Huffington Post, the Daily Mail, and The Guardian. The paper also received media attention for its investigation into cocaine use across campus, and its exposé of the questionable human rights record of Exeter University's largest donor.

In 2014/15, Exeposé continued with its focus on investigative journalism, under the editorship of Harrison Jones and Gemma Joyce. In September 2014, the paper reported on undercover footage of a University Sports team participating in an initiation-style ceremony that took place on University premises. They reported that the footage showed first year students being intimidated, forced to down shots and kiss a dead eel at an event that appeared to break the Athletic Union's code of conduct on numerous counts. The story was picked up by the Daily Mail and chosen by the Huffington Post as one of their 'Student Journalist Stories Of The Year 2014.' The paper was also threatened with legal action by the University after it published a story relating to the expenses of University staff. Exeposé was nominated for 'Student Publication of the Year' at the 2015 Guardian Student Media awards, with Editor Harrison Jones also shortlisted for two individual awards.

Under the 2015/16 Print Editors Sarah Gough and James Beeson, the paper has reported on issues such as student voting intentions at the General Election, staff redundancy, overcrowding on campus and diversity at the University. Alongside this, Online Editors Harry Shepherd and Kayley Gilbert relaunched the website. At the end of the 2015/16 editorial year, the newspaper won 'Best Use of Digital Media' at the 2015 Student Publication Association awards and was also shortlisted for 'Best Student Publication.'

In preparation for the newspaper's 30th anniversary in 2017, Exeposé saw a full redesign under the 2016/17 Print Editors - Jeremy Brown, Ben Londesbrough, Hannah Butler and Susannah Keogh - featuring a stylish, minimalist layout, a restyled culture section called 'Exhibit', and an update to the logo, which was launched in collaboration with the Online Editors - Theodore Stone and Jessica Stanier. In November 2016, Exeposé also took part in the largest collaborative X-Media event to date: live coverage of the US Election, which involved a team of over 100 people.

As of October 2020, Exeposé were named Best Publication of the Year by the Student Publication Association at the Student Publication Association National Conference. The organisation's Chair noted: "Their hard work over the last academic year was noted by the judges to have had [a] significant impact on both its university and local community."

Technical background

With the transition to tabloid format in 1995, Exeposé was produced on a single Apple Macintosh IIcx with a 21-inch monochrome CRT monitor. Increased advertising revenue convinced the Guild to purchase an  Apple Power Macintosh 8515 in 1996, and later a Power Macintosh 8600, each with a 21-inch CRT monitor. All Macs ran QuarkXPress 3.32. A scanner and an A3 ink-jet printer and Adobe Photoshop 4 on the PowerMacs allowed substantial amounts of pre-production to be done in the editorial office. This was located in a small room on Top Corridor (later known as Guild Corridor) within Devonshire House on Streatham Campus.

During post production each week, the pages and images were transferred, initially to an external portable HDD and later to several 100MB Zip disks, and physically taken down to the Express & Echo Newspaper Office at the Sowton Industrial Estate, Exeter. There, the paper was checked for consistency, proofread and sent to Data Reception for printing. The Express & Echo Editorial Team also assisted in checking Exeposé for any legal issues contained in the articles, although this service was stopped in 2001. The whole post production process took on average 6 hours to complete for each issue, a task that became hampered by the increasing age of the computer equipment in use. Technical problems plagued the paper during the period from the summer of 1999 until the middle of 2000, during which the only printer in the Editorial Office remained out of service.

Despite technical problems, it was during this time that Exeposé ran a campaign against the University's Domestic Services that won the paper a Guardian Media Award for Best Student Media Campaign. The centerpiece of the campaign was a "cut-out-and-sue" coupon, printed in the paper, written in protest at the poor upkeep of halls of residence at the time. The coupon encouraged students to write their name in a box on the page, which stated that they would begin legal action against Domestic Services. Hundreds of students signed their name on these coupons, and then posted them to the University.

In 2001, the University of Exeter Students' Guild authorised the purchase of two new Windows PCs, running QuarkXPress 4.1, Adobe Photoshop 5 and Adobe Acrobat 5.0. This enabled the post production process to become streamlined, with the pages being converted to PDF format before being e-mailed to the Express & Echo for printing.

In 2003, the editorial office was moved from Devonshire House to Cornwall House where Exeposé was produced until it moved back to Devonshire House in 2012.

In 2007, QuarkXpress 4.1 was replaced by Adobe InDesign on all of the PCs in the Exeposé office, which were again upgraded in 2010 to Apple Mac Minis, running the same, also upgraded, programmes.

In September 2012, production of Exeposé moved to new offices in Devonshire House where it continues to be produced in-house, where it shares its office with the University's student-run online television network, XTV.

Awards and nominations

National/Regional Student Journalism Awards
 2000 - Best Student Media Campaign (won)
 2001 - Best Small Budget Student Publication (shortlisted)
 2002 - Best Student Sports Journalist - Stuart Pollitt (shortlisted)
 2019 - Best Student Journalist, SPARC Southwest - Josh Brown (highly commended)
 2019 - Best Publication, SPANC (won)
 2019 - Best Website, SPANC (shortlisted)
 2021 - Best Publication, SPARC Southwest (won)
 2021 - Best Student Journalist, SPARC Southwest - Pete Syme (won)
 2022 - Best Publication, SPARC Southwest (won)
 2022 - Best Student Journalist, SPARC Southwest - Bridie Adams & Ollie Leader de Saxe (won)

Guardian Student Media Awards
 2000 - Student Campaign of the Year (won)
 2001 - Student Sports Journalist of the Year - Stuart Pollitt (shortlisted)
 2001 - Student Travel Writer of the Year - William Carless (shortlisted)
 2004 - Student Sports Writer of the Year - Gary Payne (shortlisted)
 2013 - Student Publication of the Year (shortlisted)
 2014 - Student Website of the Year (runner-up) 
 2015 - Student Publication of the Year (shortlisted)
 2015 - Student Reporter of the Year - Harrison Jones (won)
 2015 - Student Feature Writer of the Year - Harrison Jones (shortlisted)

NUS Awards
 2008 - NUS Student Publication of the Year (won)
 2010 - Best Student Journalist - Adam Walmesley (shortlisted)

References

External links
 Exeposé's website

Student newspapers published in the United Kingdom
University of Exeter
Publications established in 1987
Mass media in Exeter
Free newspapers
Biweekly newspapers published in the United Kingdom
Newspapers published in Devon